In enzymology, an indoleacetate—lysine synthetase is an enzyme that catalyzes the chemical reaction

ATP + (indol-3-yl)acetate + L-lysine  ADP + phosphate + N6-[(indol-3-yl)acetyl]-L-lysine

The 3 substrates of this enzyme are ATP, (indol-3-yl)acetate, and L-lysine, whereas its 3 products are ADP, phosphate, and [[N6-[(indol-3-yl)acetyl]-L-lysine]].

This enzyme belongs to the family of ligases, specifically those forming carbon-nitrogen bonds as acid-D-amino-acid ligases (peptide synthases).  The systematic name of this enzyme class is (indol-3-yl)acetate:L-lysine ligase (ADP-forming). This enzyme is also called indoleacetate:L-lysine ligase (ADP-forming).

References

 
 

EC 6.3.2
Enzymes of unknown structure